The Norway national badminton team represents Norway in international badminton team competitions. It is controlled by the Norwegian Badminton Association. Norway participated in the Sudirman Cup until 2007. The national team have never qualified nor competed in the Thomas Cup and the Uber Cup.

Norway is also a medal contender in para-badminton. The nation has won a few gold medals at the BWF Para-Badminton World Championships, with most medals being won by para-badminton player Helle Sofie Sagøy.

History 
The national team was formed after the formation of the Norwegian Badminton Association on 24 October 1938. Unlike other Scandinavian countries Denmark, Sweden and Finland, the Norwegian team had average results in team events in the 20th century.

Men's team 
The Norwegian men's team lost 0-9 twice to Sweden twice in the qualifiers for the 1961 and 1964 Thomas Cup. The men's team later failed to qualify for the 1967 Thomas Cup after losing 2-7 to Ireland. In 1978, Norway failed to qualify for the Thomas and Uber Cup again when the men's team lost against the Netherlands 3-6. In 1988, they finished as group runners-up for the 1990 Thomas Cup qualifiers, the team won against Mozambique and performed upsets against Ireland and Germany, but lost 1-4 the Netherlands.

Norway debuted in the European Men's and Women's Team Badminton Championships in 2006. They beat Greece to finish 3rd in their group and were eliminated in the group stage.

Women's team 
In 1978, the women's team lost 2-5 against Scotland in the 1978 Uber Cup qualifiers. In 1986, Norway finished 3rd on their group tie for the 1986 Uber Cup qualifiers after beating France and Iceland 4-1 and 5-0 respectively. In 1994, Norway were close to qualifying for the Uber Cup finals. The team topped the group but were eliminated in the semi-finals stage group tie, losing 0-5 to Denmark, 0-5 to Germany and 1-4 to Poland.

The women's team made their first appearance at the European Men's and Women's Team Badminton Championships in 2018. The team finished at the bottom of their group.

Mixed team 
Norway first competed for the Helvetia Cup in 1965. In 1968, the national team finished as runners-up, losing against Germany. The team achieved runner-up position for a second time in 1973 after losing to the Czech Republic. In 1975, Norway made history by defeating the Yugoslavian team in the final, winning their first Helvetia Cup title. The team finished in third place in 1979 and as runners-up again in 1981.

In 1989, Norway debuted in the inaugural version of the Sudirman Cup. The team were placed in classification Group 6 with Sri Lanka and Nepal. They won 4-1 against Sri Lanka and 5-0 against Nepal to claim 23rd place on the overall rankings.

Participation in BWF competitions

Sudirman Cup

Participation in European Team Badminton Championships

Men's Team

Women's Team

Mixed Team

Participation in Helvetia Cup 
The Helvetia Cup or European B Team Championships was a European mixed team championship in badminton. The first Helvetia Cup tournament took place in Zurich, Switzerland in 1962. The tournament took place every two years from 1971 until 2007, after which it was dissolved. Norway won the cup in 1975.

Participation in European Junior Team Badminton Championships
Mixed Team

Current squad 
The following players were selected to represent Norway at the 2020 European Men's and Women's Team Badminton Championships.

Male players
Markus Barth
Magnus Christiensen
Torjus Flåtten
Vegard Rikheim
Sturla Flaten Jorgensen
Fredrik Kristensen
Carl Christian Mork
William Kitching
Peter Rønn Stensæth

Female players
Marie Christensen
Vera Ellingsen
Vilde Espeseth
Emilie Hamang
Aimee Hong
Solvår Flåten Jørgensen
Sofia Macsali
Emilia Petersen Norberg
Natalie Syvertsen

References

Badminton
National badminton teams
Badminton in Norway